Warrior Lanling ( 兰陵王 ) is a musical work for the original soundtrack of Warrior Lanling,
composed by He Xuntian in 1995.

Summary 
Warrior Lanling has eight movements: 
 Ancient Echo 远古的回声
 Beautiful Phoenix Tribe 美丽的鳯雀部落
 Dance of Reproduction 生殖舞
 Lanling and Mask 兰陵与面具
 Dance of Black Hair 黑发舞
 Divine Tree 神树
 Blood Sacrifice 血祭
 Mother’s Song 母亲的歌

References

External links

Compositions by He Xuntian
1995 compositions